John Nunn (born 1955) is an English chess grandmaster.

John Nunn may also refer to:
John Nunn (sailor) (1803–1860), English sailor and author
John Nunn (rower) (born 1942), American Olympic rower 
John Nunn (racewalker) (born 1978), American Olympic race walker
John Nunn (RAF officer) (1919–2013), British Royal Air Force officer, mathematician, and politician
John Nunn (cricketer) (1906–1987), English cricketer
John F. Nunn, dean of the Royal College of Anaesthetists, 1979–1982